The Godavari (IAST: Godāvarī [ɡod̪aːʋəɾiː]) is India's second longest river after the Ganga river and drains into the third largest basin in India, covering about 10% of India's total geographical area. Its source is in Trimbakeshwar, Nashik, Maharashtra. The river ultimately empties into the Bay of Bengal through an extensive network of tributaries. In terms of length, catchment area and discharge, the Godavari is the largest in peninsular India, and had been dubbed as the Dakshina Ganga (Ganges of the South).

The river has been revered in Hindu scriptures for many millennia and continues to harbour and nourish a rich cultural heritage. In the past few decades, the river has been barricaded by several barrages and dams, keeping a head of water (depth) which lowers evaporation. Its broad river delta houses 729 persons/km2 – nearly twice the Indian average population density and has a substantial risk of flooding, which in lower parts would be exacerbated if the global sea level were to rise.

Course

The Godavari originates in the Western Ghats of central India near Nashik in Maharashtra,  from the Arabian Sea.

The river basin is considered to be divided into 3 sections: 
 Upper (source to the confluence with Manjira), 
 Middle (between confluence of Manjira and Pranhita) and 
 Lower (Pranhita confluence to mouth).

These put together account for 24.2% of the total basin area. The rivers annual average water inflows are nearly 110 billion cubic metres. Nearly 50% of the water availability is being harnessed. The water allocation from the river among the riparian states are governed by the Godavari Water Disputes Tribunal. The river has highest flood flows in India and experienced recorded flood of 3.6 million cusecs in the year 1986 and annual flood of 1.0 million cusecs is normal.

Within Maharashtra
In Maharashtra state where it takes origin, the river has an extensive course, the upper basin (origin to its confluence with Manjira) of which lies entirely within the state, cumulatively draining an area as large as  – about half the area of Maharashtra. Within Nashik district, the river assumes a north-easterly course until it flows into the Gangapur Reservoir created by a dam of the same name. The reservoir along with the Kashypi Dam provides potable water to Nashik, one of the largest cities located on its banks. The latter, located at Someshwar is more popularly known as the Dudhsagar Waterfall.

A few kilometres after its meeting with the Darna, the Godavari swerves to the north-east, before the Banganga, from the north-west, meets it on the left. The course of the main stream then tends more decidedly south. At Nandur-Madhmeshwar, the Kadva, a second large affluent, brings considerable increase to the waters of the Godavari. The river begins its southeasterly course characteristic of rivers of the Deccan Plateau. The river exits the Niphad Taluka of Nashik and enters the Kopargaon taluka, Ahmednagar District. Within Ahmednagar District the river quickly completes its short course, flowing alongside the town of Kopargaon and reaching Puntamba. Beyond this, the river serves as a natural boundary between the following districts:
 Ahmednagar and Aurangabad: Along the boundary here, it receives its first major tributary the Pravara River, draining the former district. The confluence is located at Pravarasangam. By virtue of a sub-tributary of Pravara – Mandohol, which originates in Pune District – the basin impinges the Pune district. The river at Paithan has been impounded by the Jayakwadi Dam forming the NathSagar Reservoir. Kalsubai located in Godavari basin, is the highest peak in Maharashtra.
 Beed and Jalna
 Beed and Parbhani: Located along here is its merger with Sindphana, an important tributary which drains a considerably large area within Beed. The sub-tributary river Bindusara forms a landmark at Beed.

The river beyond, near the village Sonpeth, flows into Parbhani. In Parbhani district, the river flows through Gangakhed taluka. As mentioned above, the Godavari is also called Dakshinganga so the city is called as Gangakhed (meaning a village on the bank of Ganga). As per Hindu rituals this place is considered quite important for after death peace to flow ashes into the river.

Its course is relatively non-significant except for receiving two smaller streams – Indrayani and Masuli – merging at its left and right banks, respectively. Within the last taluka of the district Parbhani, Purna, the river drains a major tributary of the same name: Purna.

It then exits into the neighbouring district of Nanded where  before reaching the town Nanded, it is impounded by the Vishnupuri Dam and thus with it, bringing Asia's largest lift irrigation projects to life. A little downstream from Nanded, the river receives Asna, a small stream, on its left bank. It then runs into the controversial Babli project soon ends its course within Maharashtra, albeit temporarily, at its merger with a major tributary – Manjira.

The river after flowing into Telangana, re-emerges to run as a state boundary separating the Mancherial, Telangana from Gadchiroli, Maharashtra. At the state border, it runs between Sironcha and Somnoor Sangam receiving one tributary at each of those nodal points – the Pranhita and subsequently the Indravati.

Within Telangana

Godavari enters into Telangana in Nizamabad district at Kandakurthy where Manjira, Haridra rivers joins Godavari and forms Triveni Sangamam. The river flows along the border between Nirmal and Mancherial districts in the north and Nizamabad, Jagtial, Peddapalli districts to its south. About  after entering Telangana it merges with the back waters of the Sriram Sagar Dam. The river after emerging through the dam gates, enjoys a wide river bed, often splitting to encase sandy islands. The river receives a minor but significant tributary Kadam river. It then emerges at its eastern side to act as a state border with Maharashtra only to later enter into Bhadradri Kothagudem district. In this district, the river flows through an important Hindu pilgrimage town – Bhadrachalam.

The river further swells after receiving a minor tributary Kinnerasani River and exits into Andhra Pradesh.

Within Andhra Pradesh

Within the state of Andhra Pradesh, the river flows through hilly terrain of the Eastern Ghats known as the Papi hills which explains the narrowing of its bed as it flows through a gorge for a few km, only to re-widen at Polavaram. The deepest bed level of Godavari River, located 36 km upstream of Polavaram dam, is at 45 meters below the sea level. Before crossing the Papi hills, it receives its last major tributary Sabari River on its left bank. The river upon reaching the plains begins to widen out until it reaches Rajahmundry. Arma Konda is the highest peak in the Godavari river basin as well as in Eastern Ghats.

Dowleswaram Barrage was constructed across the river in Rajahmundry. At Rajahmundry, the Godavari splits into two large branches which are called Gautami (Gautami Godavari) and Vasishta Godavari and five smaller branches.  Similarly, the Vasishta splits into two branches named Vasishta and Vainateya. These four branches which join the Bay of Bengal at different places, form a delta of length  along the coast of the Bay of Bengal and is called the Konaseema region. This delta along with the delta of the Krishna River is called the Rice Granary of South India.

Within Puducherry
The Gautami which is the largest branch of the whole passes along Yanam of Union territory of Puducherry and empties itself into sea at Point Godavery. In fact, Yanam is bounded on south by Gautami branch and the Coringa River originates at Yanam which merges into the sea near Coringa village in Andhra Pradesh.

Tributaries
The major tributaries of the river can be classified as the left bank tributaries which include the Purna, Pranhita, Indravati, and Sabari River covering nearly 59.7% of the total catchment area of the basin and the right bank tributaries Pravara, Manjira, and Manair together contributing 16.1% of the basin.

The Pranhita River is the largest tributary of the Godavari River, covering about 34% of its drainage basin. Indravati is the 2nd largest tributary, known as the "lifeline" of the Kalahandi, Nabarangapur of Odisha and Bastar district of Chhattisgarh. Due to their enormous sub-basins both Indravati and Pranhita are considered rivers in their own right. Manjira is the longest tributary and holds the Nizam Sagar reservoir. Purna is a prime river in the water scarce Marathwada region of Maharashtra.

Other than these seven principal tributaries, it has many smaller but significant ones draining into it. Indravati river floodwaters overflow into the Jouranala which is part of Sabari basin.

Seven mouths of Godavari 
Before merging into the Bay of Bengal, the Godavari has seven mouths in total and is considered sacred by local Hindus. As per their traditional belief, the holy waters of the Godavari are said to have been brought from the head of Lord Shiva by the Rishi Gautama, and the seven branches by which it is traditionally supposed to have reached the sea are said have been made by seven great rishis known as Sapta Rishis. Thus, they are named after these seven great rishis and are named as Tulyabhāga (Tulya or Kaśyapa), Ātreya (Atri), Gautamī (Gautama), Jamadagni (now replaced by Vṛddhagautamī i.e. Old Gautami), Bhardwāja (Bharadwaja), Kauśika (Viswamitra) and Vaśișțha (Vasishtha). So bathing in these mouths are considered an act of great religious efficacy by native Hindus. These mouths are remembered by a Sanskrit sloka as follow:

Together they are referred as Sapta Godavari and the Godavari river before splitting is referred as Akhanda Godavari. However, there exists another eight mouth named as Vainateyam, which is not one of these traditional seven mouths and is supposed to have been created by a rishi of that name who stole a part of Vasisththa branch. Godavari was frequently referred as Ganga or Ganges by ancient Indian writings. However, the original branches of Kauśika, Bhardwaja and Jamadagni does not exist any longer and the pilgrims bathe in the sea at the spots where they are supposed to have been. The traditional Bharadwāja mouth is in Tirthālamondi (now bordering Savithri Nagar of Yanam and before a Hamlet of Guttenadivi) and the traditional Kauśika mouth is located at Rameswaram, a hamlet of Samathakurru village in Allavaram Mandal of Konaseema district. Traditional mouth of Jamadagni is not known and people instead take bath in the Vriddha Gautami branch at Kundaleswaram village in Katrenikona Mandal of Konaseema district. There is a local legend saying the Injaram and Patha (Old) Injaram (now on the other bank of Gautami river within Island Polavalam mandal of Konaseema district) were split by Godavari river. Thus the Godavari passing between these two now referred as Gautami and the old passage being referred as Vriddha Gautami. In early British records, the Injaram Paragana (district) was counted along with Muramalla village (now located on the other side of Gautami within Island Polavalam mandal) and said to have comprised 22 villages.

Religious significance

The river is sacred to Hindus and has several places on its banks that have been places of pilgrimage for thousands of years. Amongst the huge numbers of people who have bathed in her waters as a rite of cleansing are said to have been the deity Baladeva 5000 years ago and the saint Chaitanya Mahaprabhu 500 years ago. Every twelve years, Pushkaram fair is held on the banks of the river.

A legend has it that the sage Gautama lived in the Brahmagiri Hills at Tryambakeshwar with his wife Ahalya. The couple lived the rest of their lives in the then village called Govuru, now known as Kovvur ("cow") since the British rule. Ahalya lived in a nearby place called Thagami (now Thogummi). The sage, as a reason for the practice of annadanam ("giving away food" to the needy), started cultivating rice crops and other crops. Once, the god Ganesha, on the wish of the munis, sent a miraculous cow maaya-dhenu, which resembled a normal cow. It entered the sage's abode and started spoiling the rice while he was meditating. Since cattle is sacred to Hindus and shall always be treated with respect, he put the dharbha grass on the cow. But, to his surprise, it fell dead. Seeing what happened before their eyes, the munis and their wives cried out, "We thought that Gautama-maharishi is a righteous man, but he committed bovicide (killing of a cow or cattle)!". The sage wished to atone for this grievous sin. Therefore, he went to Nashik and observed tapas to Lord Tryambakeshwara (a manifestation of the god Shiva), on the advice of the munis, praying for atonement and asking Him to make the Ganges flow over the cow. Shiva was pleased with the sage and diverted the Ganges which washed away the cow and gave rise to the Godavari river in Nashik. The water stream flowed past Kovvur and ultimately merged with the Bay of Bengal.

Sapta Sāgara Yatra 
In olden days a pilgrimage named as sapta sāgara yātra was made by those desirous of offspring along the banks of the holy waters from the seven mouths. It starts with holy bathing at Tulyabhaga river at Chollangi village during On Amavasya day during Krishna Paksha of Pushya month as per Hindu calendar. That day is locally referred as Chollangi Amavasya. That place where the river branch merges with sea is referred as Tulya Sāgara Sangamam. Secondly, they take bath in Coringa village in the Coringa river which is considered as Atreya branch of Godavari and the holy bathing place is called as Atreya Sāgara Sangamam. After bathing at different banks of the other branches the pilgrimage ends by bathing near Narsapuram or Antarvedi.

Settlements along the Godavari

Maharashtra
 Nashik (Holy city and site of Simhastha Kumbha Mela bathing festivals)
 Trimbakeshwar (shrine to the Jyotirlinga of the god Shiva)
 Kopargaon
 Puntamba – A place of pilgrimage with several ancient temples including the last resting place (Samadhi) of Sant Changdev in Puntamba.This town is located in Rahata Taluka of Ahmednagar district and 18 km from holy place of shree saibaba Shirdi. The only temple attributed to Kartik Swamy ( Elder son of Lord Shiva) is located here on bank of river Godavari). River godavari which had entered in kopargapn taluka of Ahmednagar from Niphad taluka of Nashik is the natural frontier between Aurangabad and Ahmednagar districts of Maharashtra onwards until it enters in confluence with river Pravara at Pravarasangam village which comes under Newasa taluka a town where famous Bhakti saint Shree sant Dhnyaneshwar had written critic on Bhagavatgeeta ' Dnyaneshwari'.
 Paithan (ancient capital of the Satavahana dynasty)
 Gangakhed
 Nanded (location of the Hazur Sahib Nanded Sikh Gurdwara)
 Sironcha (town situated near the confluence of Godavari and Pranahita rivers)

Telangana

 Basara, Nirmal district (Gnana Saraswati Temple)
 Goodem gutta, Adilabad (temple) Luxettipet, Adilabad
 Mancherial, Mancherial
 Godavarikhani, Ramagundam
 Nirmal, Nirmal district (Nirmal toys)
 Chennur, Adilabad
 Tadpakal, Nizamabad district (Armoor toys)
 Battapur, Nizamabad district (Armoor toys)
Dharmapuri, Jagtial district
 Godavarikhani, Ramagundam, Sripada Yellampalli Project
 Manthani, Peddapalli district (Gautameshwara Swami (Shiva) temple, Sri Rama, Sarswathi temples)
 Kaleshwaram, Jayashankar Bhupalpally district (Kaleswara Mukhteswara Swamy (Shiva) temple)
 Mahadevpur Jayashankar Bhupalpally district
 Eturnagaram, Jayashankar Bhupalpally district
 Manuguru, Bhadradri Kothagudem district
 Bhadrachalam, Bhadradri Kothagudem district

Andhra Pradesh

Polavaram, West Godavari district (Sri Bhadrakalisametha Sri Veereswaraswamivari Mandhiram)
Rajahmundry, East Godavari (where the Akhanda Godavari splits into two streams called "Gautami" and "Vashista" before joining Bay of Bengal)
Kovvur, West Godavari district
 Ravulapalem, Dr. B.R. Ambedkar Konaseema district
 Kothapeta, Dr. B.R. Ambedkar Konaseema district
Mukteswaram, Dr. B.R. Ambedkar Konaseema district (Sri Kshana Muktheswaraswamivari Devalayam)
 Kotipalli, Dr. B.R. Ambedkar Konaseema district (Sri Someswaraswamivari Alayam)
 Antarvedi, Dr. B.R. Ambedkar Konaseema district (Antarvedi is famous for the Sri Laxmi Narasimhaswamivari Mandhiram constructed between the 15th and 16th centuries. There is also a temple of Lord Siva that is older than Narasimha Swamy temple. The temple's idol of Lord Siva was installed by Lord Srirama.)
 Narasapuram, West Godavari district

Puducherry 
 Yanam district (Yanam is an enclave located in East Godavari district, where the Gautami joins the Bay of Bengal. It belongs to Puducherry union territory.)

Places of interest
Sites of pilgrimage include:
 Basar (originally, Vyasara) – Sri Gyana Saraswati temple is situated on the banks of Godavari in Adilabad district, Telangana. It is considered that the sage Vyasa wrote the Mahabharata on the banks of Godavari at this location near Harsha house it is the beautiful scenario, and thus the place came to be known as Vyasara.
 Kandhakurthi - Thriveni sangamam where three rivers join. Godavari, Manjira River and Haridra River
 Bhadrachalam – Hindu Temple of Rama constructed by Bhakta Ramdas in the 16th century
 Dharmapuri, Telangana – Hindu Temple of Narasimha. Godavari flows from north to south in Dharmapuri, hence the river is locally called 'Dakshina Vahini' [South Flowing]
 Kaleshwaram – Sri Kaleswara Mukhteswara swamy Temple is situated here on the banks of Triveni sangamam of rivers godavari and pranahita. It is 125 kilometres away from Karimnagar city, 115 km away from Warangal city.
 Trimbakeshwar – One of the twelve Jyotirlingas and ancient temple of Shiva
 Nanded – Takht Sri Hazur Sahib, second of the five most sacred places in Sikhism
 Nashik – One of the four Sinhastha Kumbh Mela, a Hindu pilgrimage place
 Paithan – Saint Eknath's native place, famous Jayakwadi Dam, and a beautiful garden named after Sant Dnyneshwar.

 Antarvedi, Dr. B.R. Ambedkar Konaseema district - Antarvedi is famous for the Laxmi Narasimha Swamy temple constructed between the 15th and 16th centuries. There is also a temple of Lord Siva that is older than Narasimha Swamy temple. The temple's idol of Lord Siva was installed by Lord Srirama.
 Konaseema – Delta of Godavari
 Pattiseema – A village where a Hindu temple is located on a small hill on an island in the river
 Kovvur – A village where cows resided and a place where the maaya-dhenu fell dead. Footprints of the maaya-dhenu were seen even today in the famous place Kovvur called "Goshpadakshetram" also called "Gopadala Revu" where the footprints of the holy cow are seen near the temple of Lord Shiva. Also a village which is the reason for the birth of river Godavari. It is famous for a Sanskrit school which has been built 63 years ago.
 Rajahmundry – A city known for its role in Telugu culture and birthplace of writers such as Nannayya, one of the Kavitrayam trinity of poets who translated the Mahabharata into It is known for floriculture, tourism, industries and its heritage The Godavari Pushkaralu is a major local festival that is staged every 12 years.
 Deomali peak located in the Godavari basin is the highest peak (1672 m msl) in Odisha state.

Flora and fauna

 The Krishna Godavari Basin is one of the main nesting sites of the endangered olive ridley sea turtle. Godavari is also a home to the endangered fringed-lipped carp (Labeo fimbriatus).
 The Coringa mangrove forests in the Godavari delta are the third largest mangrove formation in the country. Part of this has been declared as the Coringa Wildlife Sanctuary, renowned for reptiles. They also provide an important habitat to a wide variety of fish and crustaceans. These forests also act as barriers against cyclones, tropical storms, and storm surges, thus protecting the nearby villages.
 The Jayakwadi Bird Sanctuary is another haven for birds located near the town of Paithan spread across the back waters of the NathSagar Reservoir formed by impounding the Godavari by the massive Jayakwadi Dam. Its 341 km2 area is dotted by islands within the reservoir which serve as nesting sites for the birds.
 The Nandurmadmeshwar Bird Sanctuary is located along the back waters of the Godavari river near Nashik at its confluence with Kadva River. It is known as the Bharatpur of Maharashtra for the wide diversity of bird life that it harbours.

The following are few other wildlife sanctuaries located in the river basin:

 Bor Wildlife Sanctuary
 Eturnagaram Wildlife Sanctuary
 Gautala Wildlife Sanctuary
 Indravati National Park
 Kanger Ghati National Park
 Kawal Wildlife Sanctuary
 Kinnerasani Wildlife Sanctuary
 Kolleru Wildlife Sanctuary
 Manjira Wildlife Sanctuary
 Nagzira Wildlife Sanctuary
 Navegaon National Park
 Painganga Wildlife Sanctuary
 Papikonda Wildlife Sanctuary
 Pench National Park
 Pocharam Forest & Wildlife Sanctuary
 Pranahita Wildlife Sanctuary
 Tadoba Andhari Tiger Project
 Tipeshwar Wildlife Sanctuary

Waterfalls

It is located on the Sileru River which forms boundary between Andhra Pradesh and Odisha states. The following are a few other waterfalls located in the river basin:

 Bogatha
 Chitrakoot
 Kuntala
 Pochera
 Sahastrakunda
 Teerathgarh

Crossings

There are 4 bridges spanning the river between East Godavari and West Godavari districts.
 Old Godavari Bridge (also known as Havelock bridge, and named after then Madras governor)
 Godavari Bridge (also known as Rail-cum-road bridge and Kovvur-Rajahmundry Bridge)
 Godavari Arch Bridge (also known as New railway bridge)
 Godavari Fourth Bridge (also known as new road bridge)

Details:
 Old Godavari Bridge. Construction of this bridge started in 1876, and was completed in 1897. It was constructed under the supervision of F.T. Granville Walton who had constructed the Dufferin Bridge over the Ganges, and Granville Mills, both British engineers. Spanning over 3 km in length, it linked the East Godavari and West Godavari districts. The bridge has been a vital link enabling trains to run between Chennai and Howrah. Trains continued over the bridge for a century until 1997, when train services over the bridge were suspended after the construction of two additional bridges.
 Godavari Bridge. Construction of this bridge started in 1970, and was completed in 1974. It serves as both a railway and a roadway between the East Godavari and West Godavari Districts.
 Godavari Arch Bridge. This bridge was completed in 1997, was built upstream of the earlier bridges.
 Godavari Fourth Bridge. This bridge is the newest. It was opened to public from Godavari Pushkaras 2015. This is a road connectivity bridge link supposed to ease traffic flow between Rajamundry and Kovvur

Dams

The main Godavari River up to the confluence with Pranhita tributary is dammed fully to utilize the available water for irrigation.  However, its main tributaries Pranhita, Indravati and Sabari which join in the lower reaches of the basin, carry three times more water compared to main Godavari. In 2015, the water surplus Godavari River is linked to the water deficit Krishna River by commissioning the Polavaram right bank canal with the help of Pattiseema lift scheme to augment water availability to the Prakasam Barrage located in Andhra Pradesh. More dams are constructed in the Godavari River basin than in any other river basin of India. The following are the few dams located in the river basin:
The reservoir known as the Gangapur Bandh Sagar provides drinking water to the Nashik city and also supplies water to the thermal power station situated downstream at Eklahare.
 Jayakwadi Dam: Located near Paithan, it is one of the largest earthen dams in India. This dam was built to address the dual problems of flooding along the banks, during monsoon months, and that of drought, rest of the year, in the Marathwada region. Two 'left' and 'right' canals provide the irrigation to fertile land up to Nanded district. This dam has contributed to industrial development of Aurangabad and Jalna, Maharashtra. Majalgaon Dam is also constructed under Jayakwadi stage 2 to expand the irrigation potential further in Parbhani, Nanded and Beed districts.
 Ghatghar Dam was built for hydro power generation by diverting the water of Pravara tributary outside Godavari river basin to a west flowing river which joins Arabian sea.
 Upper Vaitarna reservoir was built across west flowing Vaitarna river merging some part of Godavari river catchment area. Godavari water impounded in this reservoir is diverted outside the river basin for Mumbai city drinking water supply after generating hydro power.
 Sriram Sagar Dam: This is another multipurpose project on the Godavari River on the borders of Adilabad and Nizamabad District. It is near the town of Pochampad, 60 km away from Nizamabad. It has been described by The Hindu as a "lifeline for a large part of Telangana". It serves the irrigation needs in Karimnagar, Warangal, Adilabad, Nalgonda, and Khammam districts and also generates power.
 Sir Arthur Cotton Barrage was built by Sir Arthur Cotton in 1852. It got damaged in 1987 floods, and rebuilt as a barrage cum roadway soon after and named after him. The roadway connects Rajahmundry in East Godavari and Vijjeswaram in West Godavari. The irrigation canals of this barrage also form part of National Waterway 4.

Hydro power stations

The Godavari river in Maharashtra is one of the rivers whose water energy is least harnessed for generating hydro electricity. The 600 MW capacity Upper Indravati hydro power station is the biggest hydro power station which diverts Godavari River water to the Mahanadi River basin. The following is the list of hydro electric power stations excluding small and medium installations.

Unutilized water
Nearly 2490 tmcft of water has gone waste to the sea on average in a water year from 1 June 2003 to 31 May 2022 (19 years). The yearly water unutilized is given below

Geology and sediment transfer in the Godavari Drainage Basin

The primary and initial catchment of the Godavari drainage basin is largely represented by the basalt of the Deccan Volcanic Province (~50% of the total basin area). This is followed by the Precambrian granites and gneisses of the eastern Dharwar Craton, sandstones, shales and limestones of the Gondwana Supergroup, various sedimentary units of Cuddapah and Vindhyan basins, charnockites and khondalites of the Proterozoic Eastern Ghats Mobile Belt and the sandstones of the Rajahmundry Formation.  The Godavari River carries the largest sediment load among the peninsular rivers and the majority of the mass transfer in Godavari occurs during the monsoon. Mineral magnetic studies of the Godavari River sediments suggest that the floodplains in the entire stretch of the river are characterized by a Deccan basalt source. The bed loads on the other hand are of sourced from local bedrock. Influx of Deccan source in the Godavari River up to the delta regions and possibly in the Bay of Bengal off the Godavari, therefore, can be related to the intensive chemical weathering in the Deccan basalts. Abrupt increase in δ13C values and decrease in TOC content accompanied with a significant increase in ferrimagnetic mineral concentration in Bay of Bengal sediments from ~3.2 to 3.1 cal. ka BP reflected a shift of organic carbon and sediment source and a severe decline in vegetation coverage. Such phenomena indicate intensified deforestation and soil/rock erosion in the Deccan Plateau producing higher ferrimagnetic mineral inputs, which is in agreement with significant expansion of agricultural activities in the Deccan Chalcolithic cultural period.

Mineral deposits

The Godavari River basin is endowed with rich mineral deposits such as oil and gas, coal, iron, limestone, manganese, copper, bauxite, granite, laterite, and others. The following are the few noted deposits:

 Araku hills, bauxite
 Godavari Valley Coalfield, coal
 Bailadila iron, iron
 Krishna Godavari Basin, oil & gas
 Malanjkhand, copper
 MOIL, manganese
 Pench Kanhan Coalfield, coal
 Rowghat Mines, iron
 Wardha Valley Coalfield, coal

Ecological concerns

The frequent drying up of the Godavari river in the drier months has been a matter of great concern. Indiscriminate damming along the river has been cited as an obvious reason. Within Maharashtra sugarcane irrigation has been blamed as one of the foremost causes.

In 2013, the river was at its all-time low in the Nizamabad district of Telangana. This had hit the growth of fish, making the life of fishermen miserable. The water-level was so low that people could easily walk into the middle of the river. Shortage in rainfall and closure of the controversial Babli project gates in Maharashtra was thought to have affected the water flow in the river and water availability to the Sriram Sagar Project except during above 20% excess monsoon (i.e. one out of four years) years.

A study has found that the delta is at a greater risk as the rate of sediment aggradation (raising the level of the delta through sediment deposition) no longer exceeds relative sea level rise. It further states that the suspended sediment load at the delta has reduced from 150·2 million tons during 1970–1979 to 57·2 million tons by 2000–2006, which translates into a three-fold decline in the past 4 decades. Impacts of this can be seen in destroyed villages like Uppada in Godavari delta, destruction of Mangrove forests and fragmentation of shoreline – possibly a fallout of dam construction.

Said to further epitomise the insensitivity towards Godavari, is the Polavaram Project which is touted to be gigantic – both in terms of size and violations. Deemed as being pointless and politically driven, the project raises questions about environmental clearance, displacement of upstream human habitations, loss of forest cover, technicalities in the dam design which are said to play down flood threats and unsafe embankments.

High alkalinity water is discharged from the ash dump areas of many coal fired power stations into the river which further increases the alkalinity of the river water whose water is naturally of high alkalinity since the river basin is draining vast area of basalt formations. This problem aggravates during the lean flow months in entire river basin. Already the Godavari basin area in Telangana is suffering from high alkalinity and salinity water problem which is converting soils in to unproductive sodic alkali soils. The following are the few coal fired power stations located in the river basin:

In popular culture
One of the ships of the Indian Navy has been named INS Godavari after the river. Godavari is also the codename of some variants of AMD APU chips.

Read More 

 Peninsular River System Of India

See also

 Godavari Water Disputes Tribunal
 Detailed list of Tributaries
 Godavari River Basin Irrigation Projects
 Godavari Arch Bridge
 Godavari Bridge
 Old Godavari Bridge
 List of dams and reservoirs in India
 River basins in Madhya Pradesh
 Godavari Maha Pushkaram

References

Notes

External links

 Gautami Mahatmya (fourth book of the Brahma-purana) English translation by G. P. Bhatt, 1955 (includes glossary)
 Godavari basin
 Rivers Network: Godavari watersheds webmap 
 
 Nashik City
 Contrasting Behavior of Osmium in the Godavari River Estuary, India, 2001
 Variations of Monsoon Rainfall in Godavari River Basin
 irfca.org

 
 
Rivers of Andhra Pradesh
Rivers of Maharashtra
Rivers of Telangana
Rivers of Chhattisgarh
Rivers of Puducherry
Rivers of the Western Ghats
Ancient Indian rivers
South India
Environment of Andhra Pradesh
Environment of Maharashtra
Environment of Telangana
Rivers of India
Rivers in Buddhism